The Passenger (French: La passagère) is a 1949 French comedy film directed by Jacques Daroy and starring Georges Marchal, Dany Robin and René Génin.

Cast
 Georges Marchal as Pierre Kerjean  
 Dany Robin as Nicole Vernier  
 René Génin as Firmin  
 Dora Doll as Colette Mouche  
 Henri Bosc as Bermond  
 Michel Marsay as Prince Grégor  
 Henri Arius as M.. Chardon  
 Germaine Gerlata as Mme. Chardon  
 Claire Olivier as Mlle Arguin  
 Marfa d'Hervilly as Mme Davracay  
 Michel Leray as Lecoulteux

References

Bibliography 
 Dayna Oscherwitz & MaryEllen Higgins. The A to Z of French Cinema. Scarecrow Press, 2009.

External links 
 

1949 comedy films
French comedy films
1949 films
1940s French-language films
Films directed by Jacques Daroy
French black-and-white films
1940s French films